Table tennis is one of the sports contested at the 2022 Commonwealth Games, held in Birmingham, England. This was the sixth staging of table tennis at the Commonwealth Games since its inclusion in 2002, and the second staging within England specifically.

The competition took place between 29 July and 8 August 2022, spread across eleven events (including four parasport events).

Schedule
The competition schedule is as follows:

Venue
The table tennis competitions are being held at the National Exhibition Centre in Solihull. Five other sports - badminton, boxing, netball, para powerlifting, and weightlifting - will also take place there.

Medal summary

Medal table

Medallists

Para

Qualification

Table tennis
A total of 160 players (80 per gender) qualified to compete at the Games. The majority achieved team qualification as follows:
 The host nation.
 Nations on the ITTF World Team Rankings as of 2 January 2020.
 Recipients of CGF/ITTF Bipartite Invitations (one nation per CGF region).
 The highest-ranked nation not yet qualified.

In addition, players not in qualified teams were individually picked as follows:
 Region-specific invitations (2 per region).
 Players on the ITTF World Singles Rankings as of 2 January 2020.
 General invitations.

Para table tennis
A total of 32 players (16 per gender) will qualify to compete at the Games. They will qualify for each competition as follows:
 Players on the ITTF Para Table Tennis Rankings as of 1 May 2022 (one per CGF region).
 A player on the aforementioned ranking not already qualified.
 Recipients of CGF/ITTF Bipartite Invitations.

Participating nations
There were 34 participating Commonwealth Games Associations (CGA's) in table tennis and para-table tennis with a total of 190 (94 men and 96 women) athletes. The number of athletes a nation entered is in parentheses beside the name of the country.

References

External links
 Official website: 2022 Commonwealth Games – Table Tennis and Para Table Tennis

2022 Commonwealth Games events
Table tennis at the 2022 Commonwealth Games
Table tennis at the Commonwealth Games
Commonwealth Games
Table tennis competitions in the United Kingdom
Parasports competitions